Strangelet is the fifth studio album by American singer-songwriter Grant-Lee Phillips. It was released on March 27, 2007 under Zoë Records.

Critical reception
Strangelet was met with "generally favorable" reviews from critics. At Metacritic, which assigns a weighted average rating out of 100 to reviews from mainstream publications, this release received an average score of 73, based on 10 reviews. Aggregator Album of the Year gave the release a 73 out of 100 based on a critical consensus of 5 reviews.

Mark Deming of AllMusic noted that Phillip's vocals on the album are "rich and satisfying", while saying "the core of this album is built around a tight and modest rhythm section, but the string and horn arrangements which adorn several tracks add a welcome luster to the melodies which dovetail beautifully with Phillips' voice."

Track listing

Personnel
 Grant-Lee Phillips – primary artist, guitar, producer
 Bill Rieflin – drums
 Peter Buck – guitar
 Daphne Chen – violin
 Eric Gorfain – violin
 Richard Dodd – cello
 Leah Katz – viola
 Stephanie O'Keefe – french horn

Chart

References

Grant-Lee Phillips albums
2007 albums
Rounder Records albums